Halilarpaç (also called Hacıhalilarpaç)  is a village in Erdemli district of Mersin Province, Turkey. The population of the village was 1032. as of 2012. The village was founded in 1773. The name of the village refers to the founder of the village Hacı Halil. According to tradition, three brothers who were barley producers founded three villages;  Arpaçsakarlar, a former village, now included in Greater Mersin. During Ottoman era, Halilarpaç was a quarter of Elvanlı, a village south of Halilarpaç. In 1934 Halilarpaç was issued from Elvanlı. Citrus (orange, lemon etc.) is the main product of the village. Tomato is also produced.

References

Villages in Erdemli District